nidirect  is the official Government website for Northern Ireland residents, providing a single point of access to public sector information and services. The content is developed by representatives from the many government departments that contribute to the site, working with a central Editorial team.

Services
Book your MOT test
Order life event certificates
Report a pothole
OSNI Map Shop

History

nidirect had a soft launch in April 2009, replacing OnlineNI, and was officially launched by the then Finance Minister, Nigel Dodds on 7 May 2009.

References

External links

Government of Northern Ireland
Websites of Northern Ireland
Government services web portals in the United Kingdom